Gornja Gorica is a suburb of Podgorica, Montenegro It is located in the western part of Podgorica, capital of Montenegro. The exact population is unknown, but it is estimated to have around 5000 people living in the area. It was under constant pressure by Austro-Hungary during World War 1 so it's also a historical place. Gornja Gorica is currently the biggest suburb in Podgorica by area (km2).

Celebrities

Petar Boljević

Božo Bikonja

References

Suburbs of Podgorica